Chakradhar means holder of Chakra that is Vishnu. It may refer to:

People

 Ashok Chakradhar (born 1951), Hindi author and poet
 Chakradhar Swami, Indian philosopher, Founder of Mahanubhava Sect in Vaishnavism
 Chakradhar Satapathy (died 2006), former MLA of the Patakura assembly constituency
 Chakri (composer) (born as Chakradhar, 1974–2014), Indian music composer and singer
 Chakradhar Singh (1905–1947), ruler of Raigarh princely state in India
 Chakradhar Gogoi, Indian politician

Places
 Chakradhar (archaeological site), in Jammu & Kashmir, India

See also 
 Chakradharpur, a city and a municipality in the state of Jharkhand, India